The 2019–20 Kent State Golden Flashes men's basketball team represent Kent State University in the 2019–20 NCAA Division I men's basketball season. The Golden Flashes, led by 9th-year head coach Rob Senderoff, play their home games at the Memorial Athletic and Convocation Center, also known as the MAC Center, in Kent, Ohio as members of the East Division of the Mid-American Conference.

Previous season
The Golden Flashes finished the 2018–19 season 22–11 overall, 11–7 in MAC play to finish third place in the East Division. As the No. 4 seed in the MAC tournament, they were defeated by Central Michigan in the quarterfinals. They were invited to the CIT, where they were defeated by Louisiana–Monroe in the first round.

Roster

Schedule and results

|-
!colspan=12 style=| Non-conference regular season

|-
!colspan=12 style=| MAC regular season

|-
!colspan=12 style=| MAC tournament
|-

|-

Source

References

Kent State Golden Flashes men's basketball seasons
Kent State Golden Flashes
Kent State Golden Flashes men's basketball
Kent State Golden Flashes men's basketball